"Genesis" was a comic book crossover storyline published by DC Comics that ran through a self-titled four-issue weekly miniseries and various tie-in issues, all cover-dated October 1997. The main miniseries was written by John Byrne and drawn by Ron Wagner.

Plot
The storyline revolves around the concept of the "Godwave", an interstellar phenomenon created by the Source that spread across the universe, creating gods on its first pass before reaching the edge of the universe and bouncing back, creating demigods and metahumans on its second pass.

The Godwave threatens reality when it reaches back to its starting point, altering or neutralizing the abilities of various metahumans and making ordinary humans feel like something is missing. The superheroes of Earth and the New Gods of New Genesis battle Darkseid to prevent him from accomplishing his plan to seize the power of the Godwave. Darkseid and his forces stage an invasion of Earth before travelling to the Source Wall where they are confronted by the heroes.

Tie-ins
The Adventures of Superman #551Aquaman vol. 5 #37Azrael #34Batman #547Green Lantern vol. 3 #91Impulse #30Jack Kirby's Fourth World #8Legion of Super-Heroes vol. 4 #97Lobo #44The Power of SHAZAM! #31Resurrection Man #6Robin vol. 4 #46Sovereign Seven #27The Spectre vol. 3 #58Starman #35Steel #43Superboy and the Ravers #14Supergirl vol. 4 #14Superman vol. 2 #128Superman: The Man of Steel #72Teen Titans vol. 2 #13Wonder Woman vol. 2 #126Xero #6Young Heroes in Love #5

Reading order 
 Green Lantern #91
 The Power of SHAZAM! #31
 Starman #35
 Steel #43
 Superman - The Man of Steel #72
 Genesis #1
 Genesis #2
 Azrael #34
 Batman #547
 Impulse #30
 Jack Kirby's Fourth World #8
 Sovereign Seven #27
 Supergirl #14
 Superman #128
 The Adventure of Superman #551
 Aquaman #37
 Lobo #40
 Young Heroes in Love #5
 Resurrection Man #6
 Genesis #3
 Legion of Super-Heroes #97
 Robin #46
 The Spectre #58
 Superboy and the Ravers #14
 Teen Titans #13 
 Wonder Woman #126
 Xero #6
 Genesis #4

References

External links

Comics by John Byrne (comics)